1. Fußball- und Sportverein Mainz 05 e. V., usually shortened to 1. FSV Mainz 05, Mainz 05 or simply Mainz, is a German sports club, founded in 1905 and based in Mainz, Rhineland-Palatinate. 1. FSV Mainz 05 play in the Bundesliga, the top tier of the German football league system, having most recently been promoted ahead of the 2009–10 season. The club's main local rivals are Eintracht Frankfurt and 1. FC Kaiserslautern. In addition to the football division, 1. FSV Mainz 05 have handball and table tennis departments.

History

Early years
A failed attempt to start a football club in the city in 1903 was followed up two years later by the successful creation of 1. Mainzer Fussballclub Hassia 1905. After a number of years of play in the Süddeutschen Fußballverband (South German Football League), the club merged with FC Hermannia 07 – the former football side of Mainzer TV 1817 – to form 1. Mainzer Fussballverein Hassia 05, which dropped "Hassia" from its name in August 1912. Another merger after World War I, in 1919, with Sportverein 1908 Mainz, resulted in the formation of 1. Mainzer Fußball- und Sportverein 05. Die Nullfünfer ("05") was a solid club that earned several regional league championships in the period between the wars and qualified for the opening round of the national championships in 1921, after winning the Kreisliga Hessen.

Play during the Nazi era
In the late 1920s and early 1930s, the club earned decent results in the Bezirksliga Main-Hessen – Gruppe Hessen, including first-place finishes in 1932 and 1933. This merited the team a place in the Gauliga Südwest, one of 16 new first-division leagues formed in the re-organization of German football under the Third Reich. The club only managed a single season at that level before being relegated, due to the high intensity play that they were unable to keep up with. Karl Scherm scored in 23 out of 44 matches with Mainz during his last season. In 1938, Mainz was forced into a merger with Reichsbahn SV Mainz and played as Reichsbahn SV Mainz 05 until the end of World War II.

Long march to the Bundesliga

After World War II, the club again joined the upper ranks of league play in Germany's Oberliga Südwest, but were never better than a mid-table side. It played in the top flight until the founding of the new professional league, the Bundesliga, in 1963 and would go on to play as a second division side for most of the next four decades. They withdrew for a time – from the late 1970s into the late 1980s – to the Amateur Oberliga Südwest (III), as the result of a series of financial problems. Mainz earned honours as the German amateur champions in 1982.

The club returned to professional play with promotion to the 2. Bundesliga for a single season in 1988–89 with Bodo Hertlein as president, before finally returning for an extended run in 1990–91. Initially, they were perennial relegation candidates, struggling hard each season to avoid being sent down. However, under unorthodox trainer Wolfgang Frank, Mainz became one of the first clubs in German football to adopt a flat four zone defence, as opposed to the then-popular man-to-man defence using a libero.

Mainz failed in three attempts to make it to the top flight in 1996–97, 2001–02, and 2002–03, with close fourth-place finishes just out of the promotion zone. The last failed attempt stung as they were denied promotion in the 93rd minute of the last match of the season. One year earlier, Mainz became the best non-promoted team of all-time in the 2. Bundesliga with 64 points accumulated. However, the club's persistence paid dividends after promotion to the Bundesliga in 2003–04 under head coach Jürgen Klopp. The club played three seasons in the top flight but were relegated at the end of the 2006–07 season. Mainz then secured promotion back to the top flight just two years later, after the 2008–09 season.

Mainz also earned a spot in the 2005–06 UEFA Cup in their debut Bundesliga season as Germany's nominee in the Fair Play draw which acknowledges positive play, respect for one's opponent, respect for the referee, the behaviour of the crowd and of team officials, as well as cautions and dismissals. Due to the Bruchweg stadium's limited capacity, the home matches in UEFA Cup were played in Frankfurt's Commerzbank-Arena. After defeating Armenian club Mika and Icelandic club Keflavík in the qualifying rounds, Mainz lost to eventual champions Sevilla 2–0 on aggregate in the first round.

In the 2010–11 season, Mainz equalled the Bundesliga starting record by winning their first seven matches that season. They ended the season with their best finish to date in fifth place, good enough to secure them their second entry to the UEFA Europa League, where they were eliminated in the third qualifying round by Romanian club Gaz Metan Mediaș.

Recent seasons
The recent season-by-season performance of the club:

Key

Stadium
The club currently plays its home matches at Mewa Arena, a new stadium opened in 2011 with a capacity of 34,034. The first event held at the new arena was the LIGA total! Cup 2011, which took place from 19 July through to 20 July 2011, with the other participants being Bayern Munich, Borussia Dortmund and Hamburger SV.

Die Nullfünfer previously played at the Bruchwegstadion, built in 1928, and modified several times over the years to hold a crowd of over 20,300 spectators. Averaging crowds of about 15,000 while in the 2. Bundesliga, the team's hard won recent success had them regularly filling their venue. The average home league attendance during the 2015–16 season was 30,324 spectators.

Club culture
Mainz is known for being one of the three foremost carnival cities in Germany, the others being Düsseldorf and Cologne. After every Mainzer goal scored at a home match, the "Narrhallamarsch", a famous German carnival tune, is played.

Reserve team

The club's reserve team, 1. FSV Mainz 05 II, has also, with the rise of the senior side to Bundesliga level, risen through the ranks. The team first reached Oberliga level in 1999, followed by promotion to the Regionalliga in 2003. After playing there for two seasons, the team dropped to the Oberliga once more. In 2008, it won promotion to the Regionalliga West again and when this league was reduced in size in 2012, it entered the new Regionalliga Südwest. A third-place finish in this league in 2014 allowed the team to enter the promotion round to the 3. Liga, where it was successful against the Regionalliga Nordost champions and played at this level in 2014–15.

European record

Notes
 1Q: First qualifying round
 2Q: Second qualifying round
 3Q: Third qualifying round
 1R: First round

Honours
League
German amateur champions: 1982
Regionalliga Südwest (II) champions: 1973
Oberliga Südwest (III) champions: 1981, 1988, 1990
Amateurliga Südwest (III) champions: 1978

Regional
Kreisliga Hessen (I) champions: 1921
Bezirksliga Rheinhessen-Saar (I) champions: 1927
Bezirksliga Main-Hessen (Hessen group) (I) champions: 1932, 1933
South West Cup (Tiers III-VII) winners: 1980, 1982, 1986

Youth
German under 19 champions: 2009
Under 17 Bundesliga South/Southwest champions: 2014

Individual Club Awards
DFB-Pokal semi-finalists: 2009
UEFA Fair Play selection: 2005

Reserve team
Oberliga Südwest (IV) champions: 2003, 2008
South West Cup winners: 2001, 2002, 2003, 2004, 2005

Players

Current squad

Out on loan

Current coaching staff
.

Managerial history

 Paul Oßwald (1933–35)
 Helmut Schneider (1946–48)
 Berno Wischmann (1950 – October 50)
 Hans Geiger (October 1950–52)
 Georg Bayerer (1952–53)
 Emil Izsó (1953 – Dec 54)
 Heinz Baas (1959–66)
 Erich Bäumler (1967–68)
 Bernd Hoss (1971–74)
 Uwe Klimaschefski (1 July 1974 – 21 September 1974)
 Gerd Menne (1 Oct 1974 – 7 December 1975)
 Gerd Higi (interim) (5 December 1975 – 31 December 1975)
 Horst Hülß (16 January 1976 – 30 June 1980)
 Herbert Dörenberg (1980 – March 83)
 Lothar Emmerich (March 1983–84)
 Horst-Dieter Strich (1984–88)
 Horst Hülß (1 July 1988 – 13 February 1989)
 Robert Jung (14 February 1989 – 30 June 1992)
 Josip Kuze (1 July 1992 – 15 October 1994)
 Hermann Hummels (20 October 1994 – 17 April 1995)
 Horst Franz (18 April 1995 – 13 September 1995)
 Manfred Lorenz (interim) (14 September 1995 – 23 September 1995)
 Wolfgang Frank (25 September 1995 – 2 March 1997)
 Manfred Lorenz (interim) (3 March 1997 – 10 March 1997)
 Reinhard Saftig (11 March 1997 – 23 August 1997)
 Manfred Lorenz (interim) (23 August 1997 – 15 September 1997)
 Dietmar Constantini (24 August 1997 – 9 April 1998)
 Wolfgang Frank (9 April 1998 – 17 April 2000)
 Dirk Karkuth (18 April 2000 – 30 June 2000)
 René Vandereycken (1 July 2000 – 14 November 2000)
 Manfred Lorenz (interim) (15 November 2000 – 21 November 2000)
 Eckhard Krautzun (21 November 2000 – 28 February 2001)
 Jürgen Klopp (28 February 2001 – 30 June 2008)
 Jörn Andersen (1 July 2008 – 3 August 2009)
 Thomas Tuchel (3 August 2009 – 11 May 2014)
 Kasper Hjulmand (15 May 2014 – 17 February 2015)
 Martin Schmidt (17 February 2015 – 22 May 2017)
 Sandro Schwarz (1 July 2017 – 10 November 2019)
 Achim Beierlorzer (18 November 2019 – 28 September 2020)
 Jan-Moritz Lichte (28 September 2020 – 28 December 2020)
 Jan Siewert (interim) (28 December 2020 – 4 January 2021)
 Bo Svensson (4 January 2021 –)

See also
 The Football Club Social Alliance

References

External links

 
Football clubs in Germany
Football clubs in Rhineland-Palatinate
Sport in Mainz
Association football clubs established in 1905
1905 establishments in Germany
Organisations based in Mainz
Bundesliga clubs
2. Bundesliga clubs